Afurcagobius is a small genus of gobies endemic to Australia.

Species
There are currently two recognized species in this genus:
 Afurcagobius suppositus (Sauvage, 1880) (Long-headed goby)
 Afurcagobius tamarensis (R. M. Johnston, 1883) (Tamar River goby)

References 

Gobiinae